Wenatchee Confluence State Park is a public recreation area and nature preserve at the north end of the city of Wenatchee in Chelan County, Washington. The state park consists of  spanning the Wenatchee River at its confluence with the Columbia River. The park is bifurcated by the Wenatchee River into north and south sections that are connected by a footbridge. The north section, located in Sunnyslope, is suburban and recreational while the south section, located in West Wenatchee, is a man-made wetland area designated as the Horan Natural Area. The park is operated by the Washington State Parks and Recreation Commission under lease from the Chelan County Public Utility District, which owns the land. Park offerings include camping, boating, fishing, swimming, and various sports activities.

The Apple Capital Recreation Loop Trail runs through the park and connects it to downtown Wenatchee.

References

External links 

Wenatchee Confluence State Park Washington State Parks and Recreation Commission 
Horan Natural Area Brochure Washington State Parks and Recreation Commission

Parks in Chelan County, Washington
State parks of Washington (state)